The 2022 All Africa Men's and Women's Team Badminton Championships was a continental stage tournament of Thomas and Uber Cups, and also to crown the best men's and women's badminton team in Africa. This tournament was held in Kampala, Uganda between 14 and 17 February 2022.

Medalists

Medal table

Tournament 
The All Africa Men's and Women's Team Badminton Championships officially crowns the best male and female national badminton teams in Africa and at the same time works as the African qualification event towards the 2022 Thomas & Uber Cup finals. 17 teams consisting of 10 men's team and 7 women's team have entered the tournament.

Venue 
Venue of this tournament is Lugogo Arena, in Kampala, Uganda.

Men's team

Group stage

Group A

Mauritius vs Zimbabwe

Zambia vs Zimbabwe

Mauritius vs Zambia

Group B

Algeria vs Réunion

Uganda vs Benin

Algeria vs Benin

Uganda vs Réunion

Algeria vs Uganda

Benin vs Réunion

Group C

Egypt vs Cameroon

South Africa vs Cameroon

Egypt vs South Africa

Knockout stage

Bracket
<onlyinclude>
The draw was conducted on 15 February 2022 after the last match of the group stage.

Quarter-finals

South Africa vs Zambia

Réunion vs Mauritius

Semi-finals

Egypt vs South Africa

Mauritius vs Algeria

Final

Egypt vs Algeria

Final ranking

Women's team

Group stage

Group A

South Africa vs Réunion

Mauritius vs Réunion

South Africa vs Mauritius

Group B

Egypt vs Zimbabwe

Algeria vs Uganda

Algeria vs Zimbabwe

Egypt vs Uganda

Egypt vs Algeria

Uganda vs Zimbabwe

Knockout stage

Bracket
<onlyinclude>
The draw was conducted on 15 February 2022 after the last match of the group stage.

Semi-finals

Mauritius vs Egypt

South Africa vs Uganda

Final

Egypt vs Uganda

Final ranking

References

External links
Tournament draws

Africa Continental Team Badminton Championships
All Africa Men's and Women's Team Badminton Championships
All Africa Men's and Women's Team Badminton Championships
Badminton tournaments in Uganda
All Africa Men's and Women's Team Badminton Championships